Rubber Band is a popular sitcom that aired on ARY Digital. Due to the show's popularity re-runs continue to air on ARY Musik. The show stars the popular music group The Rubber Band. The show's main target audience are teenagers.

Cast
 Ahmed Ali Butt
 Saami Muzzafar
 Abbas Hassan
 Ismail Tara
 Tariq Amin
 Boby
 Saad Azhar
 Maheen
 Fiza Anwar
 Muhammad Ali Jaan
 Vasay Chaudhry

See also
 ARY Digital
 Teen Sitcom

External links
 https://web.archive.org/web/20110809013441/http://thepakistani.tv/t/rubber-band.htm

Pakistani drama television series
ARY Digital original programming
Urdu-language television shows
2000s teen sitcoms